is a Japanese tennis player. He has won one ATP singles title, and achieved a career-high singles ranking of world No. 36 on 9 October 2017.

Career

Juniors
As a junior Sugita compiled a win–loss record of 34–19 (and 26–18 in doubles), reaching as high as No. 73 in the combined world rankings in February 2006. He competed in singles and doubles at the Australian Open in both 2005 and 2006, reaching the singles second round of the latter.

2007–09
Sugita had won eight ITF Futures titles in Japan and Indonesia. From 2009, he started to play mainly in ATP Challenger Tour. Sugita was received wildcard for the 2008 Japan Open to make his first ATP main draw. He finished 2009 as ranked world no.299.

2010
After reaching semifinal in Bernie Challenger, Sugita claimed his first challenger title in Kyoto. He defeated Australian Matthew Ebden in final, and he break him into world top 200 for the first time as ranked no.186. Sugita advanced to final round of qualifying in the 2010 US Open, losing to Lukáš Rosol in two sets. In November, Sugita won back-to-back Futures titles in Thailand, and reached final in the Toyota Challenger, but lost to fellow Japanese Tatsuma Ito in straight sets.

2011
Sugita started the season by playing the Chennai Open as qualifier, and recorded his first ATP main draw win against Dustin Brown in three sets. He lost to eighth seed Robin Haase in the second round. He represented Japan at 2011 Davis Cup World Group Play-offs against India, winning over Somdev Devvarman in the singles rubber, and Japan promoted to 2012 Davis Cup World Group.

2012
Yūichi started his 2012 campaign by making it to the quarterfinals of the Chennai Open before falling to Nicolás Almagro in three close sets, knocking out eighth seed Oliver Rochus and Lu Yen-hsun on the way. After competing in ATP World Tour events in Asian swing, Sugita became the runners-up of the Bangkok Challenger and Seoul Challenger. He achieved his career-high ranking of world no.116 in November.

In Grand Slam qualifying, Sugita had reached the third round twice in 2012 at Australian Open and Wimbledon, but he lost in both matches.

2013
Sugita won through the opening round in the Hall of Fame Tennis Championships, against Canadian Jesse Levine in straight sets. The Next round, he was defeated by third seed Igor Sijsling. In Asian Challenger events, Sugita won the Shanghai Challenger, winning over his countryman Hiroki Moriya, and reached the final in Toyota.

2014
Yūichi qualified for 2014 Wimbledon Championships by defeating Marco Chiudinelli of Switzerland, 6–4, 6–2, 7–5. It marked the first time he qualified for a Grand Slam after 17 failed qualifying campaigns dating back to 2009. He had previously reached the final round of qualifying at Slams four times, and he dropped decisive sets in three of those matches. He lost to 19th seed Feliciano López in the first round with three tiebreakers.

In later season, Sugita earned men's singles bronze medal in the 2014 Asian Games at Incheon, where he beat Temur Ismailov of Uzbekistan in the quarterfinal. He also earned bronze medals of men's team and mixed doubles. Afterwards, he won his third challenger title in Pune by beating Adrián Menéndez-Maceiras in the final.

2015
Sugita won through the qualifying at the 2015 Wimbledon Championships for the second consecutive year in this tournament, losing to Blaž Kavčič in the first round. After this event, he reached the second rounds in Newport and Bogota, defeating Ryan Harrison and Nicolás Barrientos. At Thai's challenger circuit, he won his fourth challenger title in Bangkok, and fifth in Hua Hin.

2016: Top 100, Olympics 
Sugita qualified for the 2016 Australian Open main draw for the first time, but lost to 23rd seed Gaël Monfils in the first round. 

In February, he claimed his second Kyoto challenger title by beating Zhang Ze in the final. This result launched him into the world top 100 for the first time in his career, climbing No. 99.

In June, he reached the second round of the Halle Open after beating Taylor Fritz in three sets. He then lost to last year's runner-up Andreas Seppi in straight sets.

Sugita finished the year ranked at No. 112.

2017: First ATP world tour title 
In March, Sugita re-entered the ATP top 100 after winning ATP Challenger Tour titles in Yokohama, Japan and Shenzhen, China. In April he made it into the main draw of the Barcelona Masters as a "Lucky Loser", and went on to defeat Tommy Robredo, Richard Gasquet and Pablo Carreno Busta before losing to Dominic Thiem in the quarter-finals. Following this success, he reached #73 on the ATP rankings.

In June–July, he reached his maiden ATP World Tour level final in Antalya, Turkey. In the final Sugita defeated Adrian Mannarino 6–1, 7–6, becoming the third Japanese man to win an ATP title, preceded by Shuzo Matsuoka and Kei Nishikori.

He beat Brydan Klein in Wimbledon, marking the first time he'd reached the second round of a Grand Slam tournament, losing next up to Mannarino. In August, Sugita won two rounds in the Masters 1000 tournament at Cincinnati before losing to eventual champion Grigor Dimitrov. He lost in the 2nd round of the US Open to Leonardo Mayer, having earlier defeated Geoffrey Blancaneaux. In Chengdu, China he won 3 rounds before losing to eventual champion Denis Istomin.  In October Sugita advanced to the 3rd round in Tokyo; lost in the 1st round in Shanghai; advanced to the 3rd round in Stockholm; at this time ranked #37 in the world, lost in the 1st round in Basel, Switzerland; and lost in the 1st round in Paris.

2018: First Top 10 Wins
Sugita and Naomi Osaka represented Japan in the mixed-gender 2018 Hopman Cup. He lost his singles match to Roger Federer 6–4, 6–3, but his leaping overhead smash delighted the fans and was included in most compilation clips of early 2018 season highlights. 

At the 2018 Australian Open Sugita earned his first win over a Top 10 player by defeating world number 9 Jack Sock in four sets. He lost in the next round to Ivo Karlović. In February he lost in the first round in Rotterdam to eventual losing finalist Grigor Dimitrov. In March he was defeated by Horacio Zeballos in the first round at Indian Wells, and by Robin Haase in the first round at Miami. In April he lost in the first round to Jan-Lennard Struff at Monte-Carlo, Guillermo Garcia-Lopez at Barcelona, and Yannick Maden in Munich. In May he lost in the first round to Philipp Kohlschreiber in Madrid and to Ryan Harrison in Rome. 

In June Sugita lost in the first round of the French Open to Horacio Zeballos. Later in the month he lost in the second round in s-Hertogenbosch to Marius Copil; and the following week at Halle beat world #7 Dominic Thiem in straight sets, in what he said was “my best match in my career,” before losing in the quarterfinal to Denis Kudla. At Antalya, Turkey, Sugita lost in the second round to Pierre-Hugues Herbert. In July he lost at Wimbledon to Bradley Klahn in the first round. In August he lost in the first round to Vincent Millot at Washington; lost in the first round to Ilya Ivashka at Toronto; lost in the first round of qualifying at Cincinnati; lost in the first round to Leonardo Mayer in Winston-Salem; and lost in the first round of the US Open to Richard Gasquet. Sugita started the week after the US Open with a record of 8 wins and 22 losses for the year, and his ranking was #98 in the world. In October he received a wild card entry into the Tokyo Open, and lost in the first round to countryman Kei Nishikori.

2019: Tenth Challenger title
In January, ranked No. 146 in the world, Sugita lost in the second qualifying round for the Australian Open. In June, ranked No. 248, he qualified for the main draw at Wimbledon, where in the first round he lost to Rafael Nadal. In September, ranked No. 134, he lost in the second round of qualifying for the US Open. 

In October, Sugita lost in the qualifying rounds for the Stockholm Open, but made it into the main draw as a lucky loser and then won three matches before losing in the semifinals. It moved him up 22 spots in the rankings, to No. 107.

2020: Twentieth Challenger final
In January he started the year by reaching the final of the ATP Challenger Tour event in Nouméa, where he lost to J. J. Wolf. The following week, ranked No. 89, Sugita received an automatic entry into the Australian Open. He defeated Elliot Benchetrit in the first round, then lost to Andrey Rublev in the second. In his next tournament in Pune, he won against Viktor Troicki by retirement, before losing in the quarterfinals to Ricardas Berankis.

In September he lost in the first round of the U.S. Open to Ugo Humbert, and a few weeks later, ranked No. 94 in the world, lost in the first round of the French Open to Casper Ruud.

2021: Second Olympics
Sugita started the year ranked No. 102 in the world. In February he lost in the first round of the Australian Open to Bernard Tomic. In March, in a Challenger Tour event in Lugano, Switzerland, he won three rounds then lost in the semi-final to eventual champion Dominic Stephan Stricker. In June, ranked No. 110, he lost in the first round of Wimbledon to Richard Gasquet. In late August, ranked No. 131, he won twice before losing in the final qualifying round of the US Open. He received an entry into the main draw as a lucky loser, where he lost in the first round to eight seed Casper Ruud.

2022
In May, ranked No. 265, Sugita lost in the first qualifying round of the 2022 French Open against Camilo Ugo Carabelli. On 26 September 2022, his ranking had fallen to No. 1090.

2023
In January, ranked No. 913, he reached the second round of qualifying at the 2023 Australian Open using a protected ranking.

ATP career finals

Singles: 1 (1 title)

Challenger and Futures finals

Singles: 36 (23 titles, 13 runners-up)

Doubles: 1 (1 Loss)

Singles performance timeline 

Current through the 2021 US Open.

Wins over top 10 players
He has a  record against players who were, at the time the match was played, ranked in the top 10.

References

External links

 
 
 
 OfficialBlog

1988 births
Living people
Japanese male tennis players
Sportspeople from Sendai
Tennis players at the 2014 Asian Games
Asian Games medalists in tennis
Asian Games bronze medalists for Japan
Olympic tennis players of Japan
Tennis players at the 2016 Summer Olympics
Medalists at the 2014 Asian Games
Hopman Cup competitors
Tennis players at the 2020 Summer Olympics
20th-century Japanese people
21st-century Japanese people